William Eden may refer to:

William Eden, 1st Baron Auckland (1744–1814)
William Eden (MP) (1782–1810), MP for Woodstock, son of the above
Sir William Eden, 7th Baronet (1849–1915), British aristocrat and politician
William George Eden, 4th Baron Auckland (1829–1890), Baron Auckland
William Moreton Eden, 5th Baron Auckland (1859–1917), Baron Auckland

See also

Eden (surname)